The 2017 Revolution Technologies Pro Tennis Classic was a professional tennis tournament played on outdoor clay courts. It was the twelfth edition of the tournament and part of the 2017 ITF Women's Circuit, offering a total of $80,000 in prize money. It took place in Indian Harbour Beach, United States, from 10–16 April 2017.

Singles main draw entrants

Seeds 

 1 Rankings as of 3 April 2017

Other entrants 
The following players received wildcards into the singles main draw:
  Eugenie Bouchard
  Nicole Coopersmith
  Victoria Duval
  Ajla Tomljanović

The following players received entry into the singles main draw by a protected ranking:
  Anhelina Kalinina

The following players received entry from the qualifying draw:
  Kaitlyn Christian
  Alexandra Dulgheru
  Quinn Gleason
  Brianna Morgan

Champions

Singles

 Olga Govortsova def.  Amanda Anisimova, 6–3, 4–6, 6–3

Doubles

 Kristie Ahn /  Quinn Gleason def.  Laura Pigossi /  Renata Zarazúa, 6–3, 6–2

External links 
 2017 Revolution Technologies Pro Tennis Classic at ITFtennis.com
 Official website

2017 in American tennis
2017 ITF Women's Circuit
2017
2017